16 Vayathinile (read as Pathinaaru Vayathinile) is a 1977 Indian Tamil-language romantic drama film co-written and directed by Bharathirajaa in his directorial debut. The film stars Kamal Haasan, Sridevi, and Rajinikanth, with Ganthimathi, Sathyajith and Goundamani in supporting roles. It focuses on the strengths and vulnerabilities of Mayil (Sridevi), a 16-year-old schoolgirl, and the challenges she faces and overcomes.

The film was originally titled Mayil, and set to be funded by the National Film Development Corporation of India. When they backed out, it was picked up by S. A. Rajkannu who produced it under his banner Shri Amman Creations, and eventually retitled. 16 Vayathinile became the first Tamil film to be shot predominantly outdoors; Tamil films were primarily filmed in Madras studios. Its soundtrack album and background score were composed by Ilaiyaraaja, with cinematography by P. S. Nivas. P. Kalaimani wrote the film's dialogue.

16 Vayathinile was released on 15 September 1977, and was distributed by Rajkannu himself since no distributor was willing to buy it. Although written off by the media as an experimental film that would fail, the film received critical praise for Bharathiraja's script, Ilaiyaraaja's music and the performances of Haasan, Sridevi and Rajinikanth. It was commercially successful, with a 175-day theatrical run. It won numerous awards, including the National Film Award for Best Female Playback Singer for S. Janaki; the Filmfare Award for Best Actor (Tamil) for Haasan and Special Commendation Award for Performance for Sridevi; and four State Awards, including Best Director for Bharathiraja and Best Actor for Haasan.

16 Vayathinile attained cult status in Tamil cinema and is considered to be the bellwether of films depicting realistic portrayals of rural life. Making stars of its director and lead actors, it was remade in Telugu as Padaharella Vayasu (1978), in Hindi as Solva Sawan (1979), and in Malay as Melati Putih (1984).

Plot 
Mayil is a 16-year old schoolgirl who lives in a village with Guruvammal, her mother. Guruvammal also takes care of a limping orphan who is dismissively called "Chappani" (Lame) by the villagers and does whatever he can to earn a living. Mayil's ambition is to become a teacher, and she hopes to marry a sophisticated, educated man; although Chappani is in love with her, she does not reciprocate his love.

Sathyajith, an urban veterinarian, arrives in the village to work and falls in love with Mayil. Believing that Sathyajith is the right person for her, Mayil falls in love with him, to the point of refusing an opportunity to attend a teacher-training course in Madras to remain with him. Despite loving Sathyajith, she does not allow him to exploit her sexually, which disappoints him. Never intending a serious relationship with Mayil, he proceeds to his native place to marry another woman. When Mayil begs Sathyajith not to leave her, he says he befriended her for pleasure—not marriage.

A dejected Mayil confesses about her relationship with Sathyajith to Guruvammal, who quickly plans to betroth her to someone else. The village ruffian Parattaiyan—who lusts for Mayil—spreads rumours about her relationship with Sathyajith. Because of this, Mayil's engagement plans are halted and the village becomes hostile to her. Unable to bear the shame, Guruvammal dies and leaves Chappani to take care of Mayil.

Chappani takes good care of Mayil, cheering her up when she needs it. She warms to Chappani, making him more confident and assertive and grooming him and his manners, to the surprise of many in the village. Mayil tells him to slap anyone calling him "Chappani" and to respond only to those addressing him by his name, Gopalakrishnan. When Sathyajith and Parattaiyan dismissively call him "Chappani", Gopalakrishnan slaps them. Mayil and Gopalakrishnan celebrate his newfound courage. An insulted Parattaiyan later beats Gopalakrishnan badly. Mayil saves him and spits on Parattaiyan in revenge.

Mayil decides to marry Gopalakrishnan, and sends him to the nearby town for buying wedding supplies. Learning of Gopalakrishnan's absence, Parattai goes to Mayil's house and tries to rape her. Gopalakrishnan returns to Mayil's house and pleads with Parattaiyan to leave her. When Parattaiyan refuses, Gopalakrishnan kills him with a rock and is arrested. He promises Mayil that he will return, and she waits every day for him.

Cast 

 Kamal Haasan as Gopalakrishnan (Chappani)
 Sridevi as Mayil
 Rajinikanth as Parattaiyan
 Ganthimathi as Kuruvammal
 Sathyajith as Sathyajith
 Goundamani as Koothu

Production

Development 
Bharathirajaa planned to write and direct a black-and-white film titled Mayil that would be funded by the National Film Development Corporation of India (NDFC), but according to him, the NFDC withdrew "at the last minute" without specifying a reason. The project was eventually picked up by S. A. Rajkannu who produced it under his banner Sri Amman Creations. Mayil was eventually re-titled 16 Vayathinile, and marked Bharathirajaa's screenwriting and directorial debut. Its dialogue was written by P. Kalaimani. P. S. Nivas was signed as cinematographer and R. Bhaskaran as editor. Chitra Lakshmanan and K. Bhagyaraj worked as assistant directors. The latter provided suggestions for scenes and dialogues.

Casting 
When the film was in development in black-and-white, Bharathiraja envisioned Nagesh in the role of Chappani. After it was changed to colour, he wanted Lakshmanan to sign Kamal Haasan for the role of Chappani, expecting to pay Haasan  since the actor had received  for Aayirathil Oruthi (1975). In 2017, Haasan recalled, "Years ago, a man sporting a soiled dhoti and shirt came to my office to narrate a script. Had I turned the offer down on the basis of his dirty clothes, I wouldn't have been here talking to you. After listening to the script, I realised that he was such a genius and the movie was the cult classic [16 Vayathinile], and he was none other than ace Bharathiraja sir".

Rajinikanth was cast as the village ruffian Parattaiyan. Bharathiraja stated in 2013 that although had finalised  as the salary for Rajinikanth after the latter initially charged , he ultimately paid  to him. Some years later, he stated that Rajinikanth's salary was lower than Haasan's due to the former not being an established star then, but added that he was uncertain about the exact salary details. 16 Vayathinile marked Rajinikanth's first appearance in a colour film. Since the actor was not fluent in Tamil at the time, Bhagyaraj read him his lines and Rajinikanth repeated them until he mastered them. For the role of Mayil, Bharathiraja initially wanted a 16-year-old girl, but after meeting 14-year old Sridevi, offered her the role, which he said would be down-to-earth and de-glamourised; to his surprise, Sridevi readily accepted. Bharathiraja said Sridevi's eyes had the "dreamy sparkle" that he envisioned the character Mayil with.

For the role of Mayil's mother Kuruvammal, Bharathiraja wanted someone who could speak the village dialect fluently and chose Ganthimathi for her acting style. The role of the veterinarian went to newcomer Shabbir Ahmed, who was given the screen name Sathyajith during post-production. His scenes were shot in ten days. Sathyajith was not well-versed in Tamil at the time of auditioning but dubbed in his own voice, even though Bharathiraja offered to have someone else dub for him. Haasan, Sridevi, Rajinikanth and Gandhimathi were credited by their character names in the opening credits, rather than their actual names.

Filming 

Shot mainly in Mysore and Kollegal, 16 Vayathinile was the first Tamil film made predominantly outdoors and no sets were used. Due to budgetary constraints the crew could not afford a camera which could film slow motion and Sridevi had to run in slow motion for the song "Chendoora Poove". For his character, Haasan grew his curly hair long and wore lungis and khadi high-buttoned shirts. Bharathiraja also recalled that he showed a "handsome Kamal Haasan in an ugly way" as he wanted to prove that characters need not always be attractive, and to break this stereotype in the film industry.

In 2017 at SICA function, Haasan recalled that he and Bharathiraja desired to take the film's cinematography like Ryan's Daughter (1970), but they did not have the required budget. Bharathiraja wanted a speckled hen for a scene, but as Bhagyaraj could not find one, he coloured a white hen with ink. The scene where Mayil spits on Parattai required several takes before Rajinikanth insisted that Sridevi actually spit on him for real.

While Bharathiraja wanted the film to follow a linear narration, it was Bhagyaraj's idea to begin the film with a flashback sequence. After the film completed its shoot, it was screened at least 20 times for the distributors and the narrative switched every time between the linear and non-linear versions. Eventually, Rajkannu himself released the film, with the flashback narrative. A sequence featuring faulty lip sync was retained in the final cut after going unnoticed. The film was made on a shoestring budget of ₹4.25 lakh (worth ₹4.7 crore in 2021 prices).

Themes 
16 Vayathinile focuses on rural Tamil Nadu, and the vulnerabilities of Mayil. Film critic Naman Ramachandran compared Parattaiyan to Rajinikanth's character Kondaji from Katha Sangama (1975), stating, "Like in that film, Rajinikanth is a card-playing wastrel with henchmen in tow. Just like the Thimmaraya character in Katha Sangama runs errands for Kondaji, here Chappani/Gopalakrishnan performs services for [Parattaiyan], but the similarity ends there because Thimmaraya is evil and Chappani is good." He also described 16 Vayathinile as the first film when a villainous character played by Rajinikanth does not have a change of heart or get away without being punished: "Here he pays for his deeds with his life." Saraswathy Srinivas of Rediff.com called Parattaiyan an "extension" of Rajinikanth's negative character from Moondru Mudichu (1976), but said that "the villainy is more pronounced and transparent here."

Film scholar Swarnavel Eswaran Pillai noted that the film was marked by "ambiguous and dark protagonists, new subjectivity, [and] avoidance of clichéd and cathartic closures". Kumuthan Maderya, writing for Jump Cut, described 16 Vayathinile as a "neo-nativity" film  a story set in rural Tamil Nadu, valorising the rustic and foregrounding the lives of villagers. Ashis Nandy, in his 1998 book The Secret Politics of Our Desires, noted that doctors in Tamil films like 16 Vayathinile are always viewed with "a bit of suspicion" and remain complete outsiders "capable of seducing women and polluting the community".

Music 
The soundtrack album and background score for 16 Vayathinile were composed by Ilaiyaraaja with lyrics by Kannadasan, Gangai Amaran and Alangudi Somu. Ilaiyaraaja requested Kannadasan to accept  citing the film's budget constraints, to which Kannadasan agreed. The album, released on EMI Records, blends folk and Western classical music.

16 Vayathinile was Ilaiyaraaja's first collaboration with Haasan. Bharathiraja insisted that Rajkannu meet Ilaiyaraaja, although Rajkannu doubted if Ilaiyaraaja would sign on since he had become well known after his debut film Annakili (1976). Ilaiyaraaja initially refused because of an earlier bet with Bharathiraja that Ilaiyaraaja's mentor, G. K. Venkatesh, would compose the music for Bharathiraja's first film. Venkatesh later insisted that Ilaiyaraaja compose the music.

Although Ilaiyaraaja wanted S. P. Balasubrahmanyam to sing "Sevvanthi Poo" and "Aattukkutti", Balasubrahmanyam had pharyngitis at that time and was replaced by Malaysia Vasudevan. "Sevvanthi Poo", the first song recorded, was the first written by Kannadasan for the film. Gangai Amaran made his debut as lyricist with Sendhoora Poove". According to film critic Baradwaj Rangan, it uses Viennese musical tropes. B. Kolappan of The Hindu wrote that the song "employs a rush of violins to set up the intro for the folk melody that follows." The term "Sendhoora Poove", which refers to a flower, was coined by Amaran since there is no such flower by that name. Ilaiyaraaja debuted as a singer with this film by singing "Solam Vidhaikkaiyile", although it does not appear on the original soundtrack.

The song "Aattukkutti" established Vasudevan's popularity. The album was remastered in DTS 5.1 six-channel audio by A. Muthusamy of Honey Bee Music in June 2013.

Release

Theatrical 

16 Vayathinile was released on 15 September 1977. Rajkannu released the film himself after no distributors were willing to buy it. Although written off by the media as an experimental film that would fail, it became a commercial success, running for over 175 days in theatres, and becoming a silver jubilee film. The film earned $1 million at the box office according to a 2010 estimate by the magazine South Scope, and Rajkannu went into hiding to avoid income-tax raids.

Critical reception 
The film received critical acclaim, with praise for Bharathiraja's script, Ilaiyaraaja's music and the performances of Haasan, Sridevi and Rajinikanth. The Tamil magazine Ananda Vikatan, in its review dated 9 October 1977, gave the film 62.5 marks out of 100, their highest rating for a Tamil film. The reviewer praised the film for representing village life with realism, and for avoiding the cliché of (studio) court and police station in its climax, but criticised the error in focusing. After seeing the film, Rajinikanth's mentor, the director K. Balachander wrote in a letter of appreciation to Bharathiraja, "You have hit the bull's eye". The writer of a Film Focus article in Tribune stated in 1983, "[Kamal Haasan] by his youthfulness alone has many years ahead of him to adorn the Tamil and Hindu screens, and going by his brilliance in Pathinaru Vayathinile, could even, displace [Sivaji Ganesan] with the passage of time" The reviewer concluded by describing "Sendhoora Poove" as a "silver lined melody that paced the film and added to its brilliance. Do not miss it at any cost."

Accolades 
In addition to the National Film Award for Best Female Playback Singer for S. Janaki, 16 Vayathinile won Haasan the Filmfare Award in the Best Tamil Actor category, and Sridevi won the Special Commendation Award for Performance at the same ceremony. The film won four Tamil Nadu State Film Awards, and Rajinikanth won the Arima Sangam Award for Best Actor.

Remakes 
16 Vayathinile was remade in Telugu by K. Raghavendra Rao as Padaharella Vayasu (1978) and in Hindi by Bharathiraja as Solva Sawan (1979), with Sridevi reprising her role in both. It was also remade by M. Raj in Malay as Melati Putih (1984). In October 2009, actor Ganesh revealed that he and his wife bought the remake rights of 16 Vayathinile for Kannada.

Legacy 

16 Vayathinile is considered a cult film and a landmark in Tamil cinema, diverging from traditional Tamil films of the time. With Annakili, the film was a trendsetter for realistic portrayals of rural life, and made superstars of Sridevi, Haasan, and Rajinikanth, as well as boosting Goundamani's popularity. Outdoor shooting of films slowly started to increase after the release of 16 Vayathinile. According to Naman Ramachandran and S. Shiva Kumar of The Hindu, Haasan's performance was considered a tour de force by critics since he was typecast as a romantic hero at that time. The dialogue "Idhu Eppadi Irukku?" (How's this?), spoken by Parattaiyan, became very popular; IANS and Rediff included it on their lists of lines popularised by Rajinikanth. Manisha Lakhe, writing for Forbes India, noted that 16 Vayathinile "paved the way for unkempt villains who had a singularly disgusting laugh." A digitally remastered version of the film was being planned for a late 2013 release; although its trailer was released in October that year, the version failed to see a theatrical release.

In July 2007, S. R. Ashok Kumar of The Hindu asked eight Tamil directors to list their all-time favourite Tamil films; seven–C. V. Sridhar, K. Balachander, Mahendran, K. Bhagyaraj, Mani Ratnam, K. S. Ravikumar and Ameer–named 16 Vayathinile. According to Ratnam, the film was "memorable for its script, high standard and realism." South Scope included Haasan's performance on its list of "Kamal's best performances" in July 2010. S. Shiva Kumar of The Hindu included the film on his December 2010 list of "Electrifying Rajinikanth-Kamal Haasan films" with Moondru Mudichu (1976), Avargal (1977) and Aval Appadithan (1978). In April 2013 News18 included the film on its list of "100 greatest Indian films of all time", saying that it was a "decisive move away from the studio-bound productions and paved the way for successful integration of subaltern themes and folk arts into mainstream commercial cinema." In August 2015, News18 included the film in its list of "10 performances that make [Sridevi] the 'Last Empress' of Indian cinema". In November the same year, Daily News and Analysis included the film in its list of "Films you must watch to grasp the breadth of Kamal Haasan's repertoire".

16 Vayathinile was spoofed in Murattu Kaalai (2012) by Vivek, whose character Saroja is called "Mayil" by Cell Murugan's character (a veterinarian similar to Sathyajith's character in the film). In Sivaji: The Boss (2007), Vivek's character delivers one of Rajinikanth's catchphrases and concludes with "Idhu eppadi irukku?". The film's title and characters have inspired other film titles such as Parattai Engira Azhagu Sundaram (2007), Mayilu (2012) and 36 Vayadhinile (2015).

Notes

References

Bibliography

External links 
 

1970s Tamil-language films
1977 directorial debut films
1977 films
1977 romantic drama films
Films directed by Bharathiraja
Films scored by Ilaiyaraaja
Indian nonlinear narrative films
Indian romantic drama films
Tamil films remade in other languages